Deterrian Shackelford is a former American football linebacker who played college football for Ole Miss.

References

Players of American football from Alabama
Ole Miss Rebels football
Ole Miss Rebels football players